Hofmeisterella eumicroscopica is an epiphytic orchid native to Venezuela, Colombia, Ecuador, Peru and Bolivia.

References

Oncidiinae
Epiphytic orchids
Orchids of South America
Plants described in 1852